Cobbinshaw railway station was on the Caledonian Railway Edinburgh to Carstairs line sited near a village called Woolfords in South Lanarkshire. The freight only branch line to Tarbrax joined here.

The Royal Mail post for the local area was dropped off at Cobbinshaw, so local addresses then had Cobbinshaw as their post district, rather than the current West Calder.

References

Disused railway stations in South Lanarkshire
Railway stations in Great Britain opened in 1848
Railway stations in Great Britain closed in 1966
Beeching closures in Scotland
Former Caledonian Railway stations